Chilton Clyde Baker (May 2, 1874 – September 28, 1967) was an American educator and politician.

Baker was born in Morrow County, Ohio and graduated from Ohio Northern University. He lived in Grand Rapids, Minnesota and was an educator. He served in the Minnesota House of Representatives from 1943 to 1946.

References

1874 births
1967 deaths
People from Grand Rapids, Minnesota
People from Morrow County, Ohio
Ohio Northern University alumni
Educators from Minnesota
Members of the Minnesota House of Representatives